Robert Sanguinetti (born February 29, 1988) is an American professional ice hockey defenseman who is currently playing with EHC München in the Deutsche Eishockey Liga (DEL). He previously played within the New York Rangers, Carolina Hurricanes, Buffalo Sabres and Vancouver Canucks organizations in the National Hockey League (NHL). He was originally drafted 21st overall by the Rangers in the 2006 NHL Entry Draft.

Playing career
Born in Trenton, New Jersey, Sanguinetti grew up in Lumberton Township, New Jersey. Sanguinetti's peewee team, the New Jersey Rockets, won the 2001 Tier 1 USA National Championship. He played in the 2002 Quebec International Pee-Wee Hockey Tournament with the Philadelphia Flyers minor ice hockey team. He later played hockey at Lawrenceville School for his freshman and sophomore years, leaving school after being drafted.

In the 2006 NHL Entry Draft, Sanguinetti was selected by the New York Rangers with the 21st pick in the first round. Sanguinetti, who grew up a Ranger fan, has said he tries to model his game after former Ranger great Brian Leetch, and has worn 22 to honor Leetch, who wore number 2.

Sanguinetti had a breakthrough year during the 2006–07 season, finishing second among all Ontario Hockey League (OHL) defensemen in goals scored (23), and tenth with 53 points. The Owen Sound Attack were eliminated in four games in the playoffs, but Sanguinetti played well, with three goals and three assists in the four games. With his team eliminated Sanguinetti was called up to the Rangers' American Hockey League (AHL) affiliate, the Hartford Wolf Pack. In seven regular season games for the team, he put up five assists and had one point in the playoffs. Sanguinetti was signed to his first professional contract in April 2007 by the Rangers. During the 2008 Stanley Cup playoffs, Sanguinetti would greet fans outside the arena and sign autographs.

Sanguinetti was promoted to the Rangers for their game on January 10, 2009, but did not play and was returned to Hartford the following day. In 2009, Sanguinetti was selected for the AHL's all-star game, playing for PlanetUSA, along with Russian teammate Artem Anisimov. Sanguinetti led PlanetUSA in the hardest shot competition.

In the 2009–10 season, Sanguinetti was again selected to the AHL all-star game, and won the fastest skater competition, setting a new AHL record. During the season, he was called up to the Rangers twice, from November 26 to December 1 and from December 16 to December 19. He made his NHL debut on December 27 against the Tampa Bay Lightning, playing 16.14 minutes on 22 shifts. He played a total of 5 games for the Rangers, with no points and four penalty minutes. He took five shots and had an even plus/minus rating.

On June 26, 2010, Sanguinetti was traded to the Carolina Hurricanes in exchange for a second-round draft pick in 2011 and a sixth-round draft pick in 2010.

During the lockout-shortened 2012–13 season, Sanguinetti scored his first NHL goal on February 24, 2013, on the road against the New York Islanders. He played in a career-high 37 games with the Hurricanes recording 6 points.

Sanguinetti and the Carolina Hurricanes were not able to agree to contract terms for the 2013–14 season, so he signed as a free agent in the Russian Kontinental Hockey League (KHL) on a two-year contract with Atlant Moscow Oblast on July 11, 2013.

On July 1, 2014, he signed a one-year free agent contract to return to the NHL with the Vancouver Canucks.

On July 2, 2015, Sanguinetti left the Canucks organization as a free agent and signed a one-year, two-way contract with the Buffalo Sabres. He made 40 appearances for Buffalo's AHL affiliate Rochester Americans in the 2015–16 season, tallying seven goals and eight assists, and did not see any NHL action.

Upon the conclusion of the season, he took up an offer from Switzerland, signing with Kloten of the National League A (NLA) on July 6, 2016. He finished the season with 29 points, including 9 goals in 44 contests, missing a few games with concussion-like symptoms.

On May 24, 2017, Sanguinetti agreed to a one-year contract with Lugano. The contract contained an option for a second year but no NHL-out clause. In the 2017-18 season, Sanguinetti led the blueline in scoring among Lugano, contributing with 11 goals and 29 points in 46 games.

As an unsigned free agent into the mid-point of the 2018–19 season, Sanguinetti returned to his former club, the Charlotte Checkers of the AHL, for the remainder of the campaign on January 1, 2019. He appeared in 10 playoff games, posting 6 points to help the Checkers claim their maiden Calder Cup.

As a free agent, Sanguinetti opted to return abroad, securing a one-year contract with German club, EHC München of the DEL, on September 8, 2019.

Career statistics

Regular season and playoffs

International

Awards and honours

References

External links
 

1988 births
Living people
American men's ice hockey defensemen
Atlant Moscow Oblast players
Brampton Battalion players
Carolina Hurricanes players
Charlotte Checkers (2010–) players
EHC München players
Hartford Wolf Pack players
Ice hockey players from New Jersey
EHC Kloten players
Lawrenceville School alumni
HC Lugano players
National Hockey League first-round draft picks
New York Rangers draft picks
New York Rangers players
Olympic ice hockey players of the United States
Ice hockey players at the 2018 Winter Olympics
Owen Sound Attack players
People from Lumberton Township, New Jersey
Rochester Americans players
Sportspeople from Trenton, New Jersey
Utica Comets players